The Sydney Supersonics are a defunct basketball team that competed in Australia's National Basketball League (NBL). The team joined the NBL in 1979 as the City of Sydney Astronauts, becoming the Sydney Supersonics in 1982 as a result of a merger with state league team Eastern Suburbs. The Supersonics merged with the West Sydney Westars to form the Sydney Kings in 1988.

Honour Roll

Season by season

References

External links

Defunct National Basketball League (Australia) teams
Sports teams in Sydney
Basketball teams in New South Wales
Basketball teams established in 1979
1979 establishments in Australia
1987 disestablishments in Australia